Loyal Heart is a 1946 British drama film directed by Oswald Mitchell and starring Percy Marmont, Harry Welchman and Patricia Marmont. The film portrays rivalry in the sheep farming community.

It was made by the independent company British National Films as a supporting feature. Location filming took place in Cumberland during summer 1944 but it was a further year before the studio-shot scenes were completed. The film's sets were designed by the art director Wilfred Arnold.

It was released on a double bill with the Hollywood costume film The Strange Woman.

Main cast
 Percy Marmont as John Armstrong  
 Harry Welchman as Sir Ian  
 Patricia Marmont as Joan Stewart  
 Philip Kay as Tommy  
 Eleanor Hallam as Mary Armstrong  
 Beckett Bould as Burton  
 Valentine Dunn as Alice Burton  
 Cameron Hall as Edwards  
 Alexander Field as Blinkers  
 James Knight as Police Sergeant
 Gerald Pring as Doctor

References

Bibliography
 Chibnall, Steve & McFarlane, Brian. The British 'B' Film. Palgrave MacMillan, 2009.

External links

1946 films
British drama films
1946 drama films
Films directed by Oswald Mitchell
Films set in England
British black-and-white films
Films scored by Percival Mackey
Films shot at British National Studios
1940s English-language films
1940s British films